Puakenikeni is the name of

 Fagraea berteriana, a tree
 a song by Nicole Scherzinger